Twist Phelan is an American writer of crime fiction. She is known for her Finn Teller Corporate Spy  mystery series, Pinnacle Peak mystery series, and her short stories, which have won numerous awards (including two International Thriller Writers Awards and the Arthur Ellis Award for Best Crime Short Story of the Year).

Biography
Phelan attended Stanford University for both undergraduate and law school.  She was a trial lawyer. On March 2013, Phelan married Jack Chapple in Denver.

Awards 

Thriller Award for Best Short Story of the Year for A Stab in the Heart (2010, won)
Thriller Award for Best Short Story of the Year for Footprints in Water (2014, won)
Arthur Ellis Award for Best Crime Short Story of the Year for Footprints in Water (2014, won)
Mystery Writers of America Six-Word Mystery Contest/Thriller (2022, won)

Bibliography

Finn Teller 
 Fake (2016)
 Exit (2016)
 Doubt (2016)
 Splice (2016)
 Coin (2017)

Pinnacle Peak 

Heir Apparent (2002)
Family Claims (2004)
Spurred Ambition (2006)
False Fortune (2007)

Stand-Alone Novels 

 The Target (2018)

Short Stories 

For the Good of the Game, published in Red Herring Mystery Magazine; The Mystery Review
A Trader's Lot (2005), published in Wall Street Noir
Crime Wave (2006), published in Crimespree Magazine
Floored (2007), published in Ellery Queen’s Mystery Magazine
Strange Bedfellows (2008), published in Politics Noir
The Peahen (2010), published in Ellery Queen’s Mystery Magazine
A Stab in the Heart (2009), published in Ellery Queen’s Mystery Magazine
Talk to Me (2009), published in ACWL Murder Past, Murder Present
Time Will Tell (2009), published in MWA Presents The Prosecution Rests and republished in By Hook or By Crook and 30 More of the Best Crime and Mystery Stories of the Year
Happine$$ (2012), published in MWA Presents the Rich and the Dead
I’m Learning (2012), published in ACWL Murder Here, Murder There
The Fourteenth Juror (2012), published in MWA Presents Vengeance
Footprints in Water (2013), published in Ellery Queen's Mystery Magazine
Game (2018), published in Ellery Queen's Mystery Magazine
Fathers-in-Law (2019), published in Ellery Queen's Mystery Magazine
Rude Awakening (2019), published in Ellery Queen's Mystery Magazine
Used To Be (2020), published in Ellery Queen's Mystery Magazine
The Bridge (2022), published in Ellery Queen's Mystery Magazine
The Kindness of Strangers (2022), published in Ellery Queen's Mystery Magazine
It’s a Small World (After All) (2023), published in Ellery Queen's Mystery Magazine
List of Contributors (2023), published in The Dark City Crime & Mystery Magazine

Short Story Collection 
 Criminal Record (2017)

Articles 

Cowboy Up (2002), published in Mystery Scene Magazine
Queen of the Road (2004), published in Mystery Scene Magazine
The Writer's Life...From the Other Side of the Breakfast Table (2005), published in Mystery Scene Magazine
Climb Every Mountain...and Building, Too (2006), published in Mystery Scene Magazine 
Paddle Up! (2007), published in Mystery Scene Magazine

Essays 

Twist Phelan on Bootlegger's Daughter by Margaret Maron (2006), published in Mystery Muses: 100 Classics that Inspire Today's Mystery Writers
The "Art" of Writing (2023) published in Something is Going to Happen

References

External links 
 
 Twist Phelan at the Crime Writers of Canada
 Experience: I dated 100 men in 100 days at The Guardian
The First 100 Dates Were Just a Warm-Up at The New York Times

Year of birth missing (living people)
Living people
American crime fiction writers
American women writers
Stanford Law School alumni
Women crime fiction writers
21st-century American women
Trial lawyers